Peter Randall Fowler (born 9 June 1959) is an Australian golfer who plays on the PGA Tour of Australasia and European Senior Tour.

Career
Fowler was born in Hornsby, New South Wales. He turned professional in 1977 and won the Australian Open in 1983. He has spent a large part of his career playing on the European Tour, where he made the top one hundred on the Order of Merit every year from 1983 to 1993, with a best ranking of 22nd in 1989. His only European Tour win came at the 1993 BMW International Open in Germany.

After struggling for form in through the mid and late nineties Fowler enjoyed something of an Indian summer between 2002 and 2004, returning to the top hundred for those three seasons, and recording his best finish in The Open Championship in 2003 when he came joint 22nd.

Another career highlight for Fowler was winning the 1989 World Cup for Australia in partnership with Wayne Grady. In addition to the team title, Fowler won the prize for the best individual performance.

In 2009, Fowler joined the European Senior Tour, making his début in the Jersey Seniors Classic, which was played at the same venue, La Moye Golf Club, at which he had made his first appearance on the European Tour in 1983.

Professional wins (20)

European Tour wins (1)

European Tour playoff record (0–1)

PGA Tour of Australasia wins (4)

PGA Tour of Australasia playoff record (0–2)

Asia Golf Circuit wins (1)

Other wins (5)
1979 Wyong Open
1988 French Medal Match Play
1989 World Cup (team with Wayne Grady and individual)

European Senior Tour wins (7)

European Senior Tour playoff record (0–2)

Asia Pacific Champions Tour wins (2)
2012 City of South Perth Masters, ISPS Handa Australian Senior Open

Japan Senior Tour wins (1)
2016 ISPS Handa Cup Philanthropy Senior Tournament

Other senior wins (1) 

 2011 Australian PGA Seniors Championship

Results in major championships

Note: Fowler only played in The Open Championship.

CUT = missed the half-way cut (3rd round cut in 1983 Open Championship)
"T" indicates a tie for a place

Team appearances
World Cup (representing Australia): 1989 (winners, individual winner)

See also
2007 Challenge Tour graduates

References

External links

Australian male golfers
PGA Tour of Australasia golfers
European Tour golfers
European Senior Tour golfers
PGA Tour Champions golfers
Sportsmen from New South Wales
1959 births
Living people